Bob Reid (born 8 June 1924) is  a former Australian rules footballer who played with Footscray in the Victorian Football League (VFL).

Notes

External links 
		

1924 births
Possibly living people
Australian rules footballers from Victoria (Australia)
Western Bulldogs players